NGC 4485 is an irregular galaxy located in the northern constellation of Canes Venatici. It was discovered January 14, 1788 by William Herschel. This galaxy is located at a distance of  29 million light years and is receding with a heliocentric radial velocity of 483 km/s.

NGC 4485 is interacting with the spiral galaxy NGC 4490 and as a result both galaxies are distorted and are undergoing intense star formation. Both galaxies are otherwise isolated and of low mass. The star formation rate in NGC 4485 is ·yr−1.

Gallery

References

External links 
 

Irregular galaxies
Canes II Group
Canes Venatici
4485
07648
41326